Wessin is a village and a former municipality  in the Ludwigslust-Parchim district, in Mecklenburg-Vorpommern, Germany. The village is rural and the main land use within the boundary is farming.

History
On the northern edge of the village is the stone church, which dates from the 12th century AD.

The grounds of the Kurzzeitpflege am Tulpenbaum former manor house contain one of Germany's largest and oldest specimens of Liriodendron tulipifera, at approx  in height.

The former municipality included the villages of Badegow and Radepohl. Since 1 January 2011, all three villages are administratively part of the town Crivitz.

References

Villages in Mecklenburg-Western Pomerania